Sustainable dentistry is when a dental organization voluntarily embeds corporate social responsibility into its organizational culture through the creation of a sustainability policy that outlines its commitment to and strategy for internally and externally focusing all its activities on realizing a triple bottom line, i.e. economic prosperity, social responsibility, and environmental stewardship. Managing sustainability in dentistry, therefore, is the implementation, monitoring, and adjusting of what this sustainability policy entails within a dental organization. Dental practices can uphold sustainable dentistry by reducing their carbon footprint through various methods such as monitoring product procurement.

References

Dentistry
Sustainability